Shopping is a 2013 New Zealand coming-of-age film written and directed by Mark Albiston and Louis Sutherland.  It stars Kevin Paulo as a mixed race Samoan New Zealander who falls in with a group of shoplifters led by an Eastern-European immigrant played by Jacek Koman.  It premiered at the Sundance Film Festival in January 2013 and was released in New Zealand on 30 May 2013.

Plot 
On the Kapiti Coast in 1981, mixed-race teenager Willie and his younger brother, Solomon, spend increasing amounts of time away from their violent father and religious mother.  Willie draws the appreciation of professional thief Bennie after unintentionally aiding one of his robberies.  Drawn to the camaraderie of Bennie's gang, Willie must decide whether to follow them as they move on or stay behind to care for Solomon.

Cast 
 Kevin Paulo as Willie
 Julian Dennison as Solomon
 Jacek Koman as Bennie
 Alistair Browning as Terry, Willie's father
 Laura Petersen as Nicky, Bennie's daughter
 Maureen Fepuleai as Willie's mother
 Byron Coll as Lindsay
 Matthias Luafutu as Red

Production 
The film was inspired by real life events for writer-directors Albiston and Sutherland, who grew up together.  It is their feature film debut, after having collaborated in short films.  Shopping followed Boy, another New Zealand coming-of-age film about a boy of Polynesian descent, but Albiston said Boy was more of an inspiration in that it showed there was a market for such stories than creatively.  Sutherland, who was working on the script at the time of Boys release, did not watch it.  Casting for Shopping was difficult; Sutherland said they toured many colleges to find their lead but eventually stumbled upon Paulo at a restaurant.  Dennison was cast after extensive auditions, and Petersen, a drama student at the time, was discovered at a local college.  During production, the two directors would split jobs, which they later described as a poor use of their collaborative skills.  They said they were often told they were doing things improperly; at first, they found this unnerving but eventually found it exciting "because we know we're working unconventionally".

Release 
Shopping premiered at the Sundance Film Festival in January 2013.  Madman Entertainment released it in New Zealand on 30 May 2013, and it grossed $US82,756.

Reception 
The New Zealand Herald rated it 4/5 stars and called it "an affecting, memorable movie that is sure to figure in local best-of-year lists" despite minor issues in plotting.  The Dominion Post rated it 4/5 stars and wrote that it "looks great and has great performances".  The Manawatu Standard instead criticized the film's lack of plotting in favor of cinematography, rating it 1/5 stars.  American trade publications Variety and The Hollywood Reporter, commenting on the film's uncompromising authenticity, both said that outsiders may find it different to understand or relate to.  Variety called it "a rough-hewn but confident first feature" that takes too much influence from the filmmakers' background in short films, and The Hollywood Reporter wrote that the film "sacrifice[s] clarity and character involvement" for its intentionally rough aesthetic.  Screen Daily similarly wrote that the film makes no concessions to outsiders but is "a labour of love" that film festival audiences will enjoy.

References

External links 
 
 Shopping Kapiti's big new film, a write-up at The Dominion Post

2013 films
2010s coming-of-age drama films
New Zealand coming-of-age drama films
Films set in 1981
Films set in New Zealand
Films shot in New Zealand
2013 drama films
2010s English-language films